Buzoești is a commune in Argeș County, Muntenia, Romania. It is composed of eleven villages: Bujoreni, Buzoești, Cornățel, Curteanca, Ionești, Podeni, Redea, Șerboeni, Tomșanca, Vlăduța and Vulpești (the commune centre).

Natives
 Ionuț Badea

References

Communes in Argeș County
Localities in Muntenia